Luis Javier Mosquera Lozano (born 27 March 1995) is a Colombian Olympic weightlifter. He represented his country in the Men's 69 kg Weightlifting competition at the 2016 Summer Olympics on August 9, 2016, winning the bronze medal. He initially finished fourth behind Izzat Artykov, who was later disqualified for failing a performance-enhancing drugs test. He received his bronze medal on March 28, 2019.

In 2021, he won the silver medal in the men's 67 kg event at the 2020 Summer Olympics held in Tokyo, Japan.

Career
In 2012, he was the Youth World Champion in the 62kg category. He is a two time Junior Pan American Champion, winning in 2014 in the 62kg category and in 2015 in the 69kg category. He is also a two time Junior World Champion, winning in 2014 in the 62kg category and in 2015 in the 69kg category. In 2015, he was the Pan American Games champion and in 2016 was the South American Games Champion.

In 2016 he competed at the 2016 Summer Olympics winning bronze medal in the 69 kg division.

In 2021 he competed at the 2020 Summer Olympics in the 67 kg category winning the silver medal with a total of 331 kg.

Major results

References

External links
 

1995 births
Living people
Colombian male weightlifters
Weightlifters at the 2016 Summer Olympics
Weightlifters at the 2020 Summer Olympics
Olympic weightlifters of Colombia
Medalists at the 2016 Summer Olympics
Medalists at the 2020 Summer Olympics
Olympic medalists in weightlifting
Olympic silver medalists for Colombia
Olympic bronze medalists for Colombia
Pan American Games medalists in weightlifting
Weightlifters at the 2015 Pan American Games
Weightlifters at the 2019 Pan American Games
Pan American Games gold medalists for Colombia
Medalists at the 2015 Pan American Games
Medalists at the 2019 Pan American Games
Pan American Weightlifting Championships medalists
21st-century Colombian people
People from Valle del Cauca Department